William Renwick Riddell (6 April 185218 February 1945) was a Canadian lawyer, judge, and historian.

Early life and education

Riddell was born on 6 April 1852 in Hamilton Township, Ontario, and attended a public school in Hamilton Township, Cobourg Collegiate Institute, and Victoria College (then located in Cobourg). He received a BA from Victoria College in 1874.

Legal career 
Riddell was called to the bar in 1883 and conducted a law practice in Cobourg until he moved to Toronto in 1893. Riddell was named a queen's counsel in 1899. In 1892, he attempted to prevent the Law Society of Upper Canada from admitting Clara Brett Martin to the bar of Ontario.

Riddell was appointed as judge to the Supreme Court of Ontario in 1906. He was the trial judge in Sero v Gault, where Eliza Sero, a Mohawk woman, argued that her fishing net had been illegally seized by Thomas Gault, a government fisheries inspector, because the Haudenosaunee were sovereign over the land on which she lived. He dismissed Sero's claim.

He was elevated to the Court of Appeal for Ontario in 1925 and remained in office until his death in 1945.

Writing 
As a historian, he published numerous works of legal, medical, and social history, including biographies of William Kirby and John Graves Simcoe. Riddell wrote more than 1,200 articles on history, law, and other subjects. 

Riddell was the president of Crossen Car Manufacturing Company and married Anna Crossen, daughter of the company's founder.

Personal life and views 
Riddell had an interest in the history of slavery in Canada and abolition, but held racist views about Black people. He regarded Indigenous people as inferior to whites.

He was known for biting, sarcastic remarks, and was an "ardent imperialist". Riddell was not well-liked: William Mulock thought him a "terrible man", while according to John Josiah Robinette, "everyone hated the old boy".

Riddell died at his home in Toronto on 18 February 1945.

Works
 Some Early Legislation and Legislators in Upper Canada (1913)
 Constitution of Canada in Its History and Practical Working (1917)
 Old Province Tales (1920)
 Travels of La Rochefoucauld in Canada 1795 (?)
 First Judge at Detroit and His Court (?)
 First Law Reporter in Upper Canada and His Reports (?)
 Magna Carta (?)
 The Legal Profession in Upper Canada in Its Early Periods (1916)
 The Life of Robert Fleming Gourlay (?)
 William Kirby (1923)
 John Richardson (c1926)
 Upper Canada Sketches (?)
 The Bar and the Courts of the Province of Upper Canada (1928)
 The Life of William Dummer Powell... (1924)
 The Life of John Graves Simcoe (1926)
 British Courts in Michigan (?)
 Michigan Under British Rule (1926)
 Joseph Willcocks: Sheriff, Member of Parliament and Traitor (1927)
 The Courts Of Ontario, (?)
 The Bar Of Ontario, (?)
 The Works of Fracastorius on Morbus Gallicus (?)
 A Philadelphia Lawyer in Canada in 1810 (?)
 Civics (?)
 The Constitution of Canada in Form and in Fact (?)
 Canadian Abridgement [edited] (?)

References

Sources

External links
 

1852 births
1945 deaths
20th-century Canadian historians
20th-century Canadian lawyers
Canadian male non-fiction writers
Historians of Canada
Judges in Ontario
Justices of the Court of Appeal for Ontario
People from Cobourg